George Russell Harrison (July 14, 1898 – July 27, 1979) was an American physicist.

Harrison became Professor of Experimental Physics at the Massachusetts Institute of Technology (MIT) in 1930, and was appointed the school's Dean of Science in 1942; he also headed MIT's Spectroscopy Laboratory. During World War II, he was chief of the Optics Division of the National Defense Research Committee, and later head of the Office of Field Service of the Office of Scientific Research and Development. Harrison was elected to the American Academy of Arts and Sciences in 1931. He served as president of the Optical Society of America from 1945–46 and was awarded the Frederic Ives Medal in 1949.  He was presented with the Medal of Freedom in 1946 by President Harry Truman.  He was elected to the American Philosophical Society in 1950. He remained Dean of Science at MIT until his retirement in 1964. His son David Kent Harrison was a professor of mathematics at the University of Oregon and a Guggenheim Fellow for the academic year 1963–1964. His son is the composer and pianist Michael Harrison.

See also
Optical Society of America#Past Presidents of the OSA

References

Sources

External links

 Articles Published by early OSA Presidents  Journal of the Optical Society of America

1898 births
1979 deaths
Presidents of Optica (society)
20th-century American physicists
Massachusetts Institute of Technology School of Science faculty
Recipients of the Medal of Freedom
Optical physicists
Fellows of the American Physical Society

Members of the American Philosophical Society